Bruce Rogers is a Canadian broadcast journalist, author and politician. Rogers is best known for his work as a television host on TVOntario and as a radio broadcaster on CBC Radio and CFRB in Toronto.
Rogers worked from the Canadian Broadcasting Corporation from the 1960s through the 1980s and was the first host of CBC Radio Toronto's Metro Morning from 1973 to 1974. He also hosted Radio Noon, Sunday Magazine,  The World at Six as well as numerous hourly news bulletins. On television, he hosted CBLT's The Rogers Report as well as various newscasts. His work on TVO has included hosting a number of finance-oriented shows such as Money$worth and Money$ense.

After retiring from the CBC, Rogers was a newsreader at CFRB from 1991 to 1998, and has taught broadcast journalism at Ryerson University (now Toronto Metropolitan University).

He has run as a candidate for the New Democratic Party on several occasions:
 in the Toronto riding of Parkdale in the 1968 federal election in which he placed second;
 in Oshawa in the 2000 federal election;
in Clarington—Scugog—Uxbridge in the 2004 federal election; and
in Durham in the 2006 federal election.

Rogers has written a book on Canadian English and speech, You Can Say That Again! .

References

Canadian television journalists
New Democratic Party candidates for the Canadian House of Commons
Living people
CBC Radio hosts
Canadian radio news anchors
Year of birth missing (living people)